Ronald Hubert Holyoake (17 February 1894 – 8 November 1966) was an English first-class cricketer who played three games for Worcestershire late in the 1924 season. His highest score of 22 was made in the second of these, against Nottinghamshire at New Road.

Holyoake was born in Droitwich, Worcestershire; he died in the same town at the age of 72.

External links
 

1894 births
1966 deaths
People from Droitwich Spa
English cricketers
Worcestershire cricketers
Sportspeople from Worcestershire